Andy Roddick was the defending champion, and won in the final 7–5, 6–3, against Marcos Baghdatis.

Players

Draw

Main draw

Play-offs

External links
Official AAMI Classic website
2008 AAMI Classic results

Kooyong Classic
AAMI